Julius Caesar, was  assassinated by a group of senators on the Ides of March (15 March) of 44 BC during a meeting of the Senate at the Curia of Pompey of the Theatre of Pompey in Rome where the senators stabbed Caesar 23 times. They claimed to be acting over fears that Caesar's unprecedented concentration of power during his dictatorship was undermining the Roman Republic. At least 60 to 70 senators were party to the conspiracy, led by Marcus Junius Brutus, Gaius Cassius Longinus, and Decimus Junius Brutus Albinus. Despite the death of Caesar, the conspirators were unable to restore the institutions of the Republic. The ramifications of the assassination led to the Liberators' civil war and ultimately to the Principate period of the Roman Empire.

Causes

Caesar had served the Republic for eight years in the Gallic Wars, fully conquering the region of Gaul (roughly equivalent to modern-day France). After the Roman Senate demanded that Caesar disband his army and return home as a civilian, he refused, crossing the Rubicon with his army and plunging Rome into Caesar's Civil War in 49 BC. After defeating the last of the opposition, Caesar was appointed dictator perpetuo ("dictator in perpetuity") in early 44 BC. Roman historian Titus Livius describes three incidents that occurred from 45 to 44 BC as the final causes of Caesar's assassination – the "three last straws" as far as some Romans were concerned.

The first incident took place in December 45 BC or possibly early 44 BC. According to Roman historian Cassius Dio, after the Senate had voted to bestow a large group of honours upon Caesar, they decided to present them to him formally, and marched as a senatorial delegation to the Temple of Venus Genetrix. When they arrived, etiquette called for Caesar to stand up to greet the senators, but he did not rise. He also joked about their news, saying that his honours needed to be cut back instead of increased. Roman historian Suetonius wrote (almost 150 years later) that Caesar failed to rise in the temple, either because he was restrained by the consul Lucius Cornelius Balbus or that he balked at the suggestion he should rise. Regardless of the reasoning, by practically rejecting a senatorial gift and not acknowledging the delegation's presence with proper etiquette, Caesar gave the strong impression that he no longer cared about the Senate.

The second incident occurred in 44 BC. One day in January, the tribunes Gaius Epidius Marullus and Lucius Caesetius Flavus discovered a diadem on the head of the statue of Caesar on the Rostra in the Roman Forum. According to Suetonius, the tribunes ordered that the wreath be removed as it was a symbol of Jupiter and royalty. Nobody knew who had placed the diadem, but Caesar suspected that the tribunes had arranged for it to appear so that they could have the honour of removing it. Matters escalated shortly after on the 26th, when Caesar was riding on horseback to Rome on the Appian Way. A few members of the crowd greeted him as rex ("king"), to which Caesar replied, "I am not Rex, but Caesar" ("Non sum Rex, sed Caesar"). This was wordplay; "Rex" was a family name as well as a Latin title. Marullus and Flavus, the aforementioned tribunes, were not amused, and ordered the man who first cried "rex" arrested. In a later senate meeting, Caesar accused the tribunes of attempting to create opposition to him, and had them removed from office and membership in the Senate. The Roman plebs took their tribunes seriously as the representatives of the common people; Caesar's actions against the tribunes put him on the wrong side of public opinion.

The third incident took place at the festival of the Lupercalia, on 15 February 44 BC. Mark Antony, who had been elected co-consul with Caesar, climbed onto the Rostra and placed a diadem on Caesar's head, saying "The People give this to you through me." While a few members of the crowd applauded, most responded with silence. Caesar removed the diadem from his head; Antony again placed it on him, only to get the same response from the crowd. Finally, Caesar put it aside to use as a sacrifice to Jupiter Optimus Maximus. "Jupiter alone of the Romans is king", Caesar said, which received an enthusiastic response from the crowd. At the time, many believed that Caesar's rejection of the diadem was a way for him to see if there was enough support for him to become king, and despised him for it.

According to Suetonius, Caesar's assassination ultimately occurred primarily due to concerns that he wished to crown himself the king of Rome. These concerns were exacerbated by the "three last straws" of 45 and 44 BC. In just a few months, Caesar had disrespected the Senate, removed People's Tribunes, and toyed with monarchy. By February, the conspiracy that caused his assassination was being born.

Conspiracy 

The conspiracy to assassinate Julius Caesar began with a meeting between Cassius Longinus and his brother-in-law Marcus Brutus in the evening of 22 February 44 BC, when after some discussion the two agreed that something had to be done to prevent Caesar from becoming king of the Romans.

The two men then began to recruit others. While it took only one man to murder another, Brutus believed that for the assassination of Caesar to be considered a legitimate removal of a tyrant, done for the sake of their country, it must include a large number of Rome's leading men. They attempted to strike a balance: they aimed to recruit enough men to surround Caesar and fight his supporters, but not so many that they would risk being discovered. They preferred friends to acquaintances and recruited neither reckless youths nor feeble elders. In the end, the conspirators recruited senators near the age of forty, as were they. The men assessed each potential recruit with innocent-sounding questions. The ancient sources report that in the end, around sixty to eighty conspirators joined the plot, although the latter number may be a scribal error.

Notable conspirators included Pacuvius Labeo, who answered affirmatively on 2 March when Brutus asked him whether it was wise for a man to put himself into danger if it meant overcoming evil or foolish men; Decimus Brutus, who joined on 7 March after being approached by Labeo and Cassius; Gaius Trebonius, Tillius Cimber, Minucius Basilus, and the brothers Casca (Publius and another whose name is unknown), all men from Caesar's own ranks; and Pontius Aquila, who had been personally humiliated by Caesar. According to Nicolaus of Damascus, the conspirators included Caesar's soldiers, officers, and civilian associates, and while some joined the conspiracy due to concerns over Caesar's authoritarianism, many had self-interested motives such as jealousy: feeling that Caesar had not rewarded them enough or that he had given too much money towards Pompey’s former supporters. The conspirators did not meet openly but instead secretly assembled at each other's homes and in small groups in order to work out a plan.

First, the conspirators discussed the addition of two other men to the conspiracy. Cicero, the famous orator, was trusted by both Cassius and Brutus, and had made it no secret that he considered Caesar's rule oppressive. He also had great popularity among the common people and a large network of friends, which would help attract others to join their cause. However, the conspirators considered Cicero too cautious; at that time, Cicero was over sixty, and the conspirators thought he would be too likely to put safety over speed when planning the assassination. Next, the conspirators considered Mark Antony, aged thirty-nine and one of Caesar's best generals. The conspirators were agreeing to attempt to recruit him until Gaius Trebonius spoke. He revealed that he had personally approached Antony the summer before and asked him to join a different conspiracy to end Caesar's life, and Antony had turned him down. This rejection to the old conspiracy caused the conspirators to decide against recruiting Antony.

Now, however, a new idea took place. Antony was strong because of his familiarity with the soldiers, and powerful due to his consulship. If Antony was not to join them, then they must assassinate Antony as well, lest he interfere with the conspiracy. Eventually, this idea was expanded upon and split the conspirators into two factions. The optimates, the "Best Men" of Rome, among the conspirators wanted to go back to the way things were before Caesar. This would entail killing both Caesar and all the men around him, including Antony, and reverting Caesar's reforms. The former supporters of Caesar among the conspirators did not agree to this. They liked Caesar's reforms, and did not want a purge of Caesar's supporters. However, even they agreed to kill Antony.

Brutus disagreed with both. He argued that killing Caesar, and doing nothing else, was the option they should choose. The conspirators claimed to be acting based on the principles of law and justice, he told them, and it would be unjust to kill Antony. While the assassination of Caesar would be viewed as the killing of a tyrant, killing his supporters would be seen only as a politicized purge and the work of Pompey's former supporters. By keeping Caesar's reforms intact, they would both keep the support of the Roman people, who Brutus believed opposed Caesar the king, not Caesar the reformer, and the support of Caesar's soldiers and other supporters. His argument convinced the other conspirators. They began making plans for Caesar's assassination.

The conspirators believed that how and where they assassinated Caesar would make a difference. An ambush in a secluded area would have a different impact on public opinion than an assassination in the heart of Rome. The conspirators came up with multiple ideas for the assassination. They considered an attack on Caesar while he was walking on the Via Sacra, the "Sacred Street". Another idea was to wait to attack him during the elections for new consuls. The conspirators would wait for Caesar to begin crossing the bridge that all voters crossed as part of the election procedures, and then topple him over the rail and into the water. There would be conspirators waiting in the water for Caesar, with daggers drawn. Another plan was to attack at a gladiatorial game, which had the benefit that nobody would be suspicious of armed men.

Finally, somebody brought up the idea to assassinate Caesar at one of the senate meetings. All other plans had one detriment: while Caesar had no official bodyguards, he asked his friends to protect him in public. Most of these friends were imposing and dangerous-looking and the conspirators were afraid that they would interfere with the assassination. Here, this would not be an issue, since only senators were allowed in the Senate House. Some also said that the murder of a tyrant in full view of the Senate would not be seen as a political plot, but as a noble act, done on behalf of their country. The conspirators ultimately settled on this as the chosen plan. Caesar would be leaving the city on 18 March to embark on a military campaign against the Getae and the Parthians. The last senate meeting before that date was on the 15th, the Ides of March, and so the conspirators chose this as the day of the assassination.

In the days leading up to the Ides, Caesar was not completely oblivious to what was being planned. According to the ancient historian Plutarch, a seer had warned Caesar that his life would be in danger no later than the Ides of March. The Roman biographer Suetonius identifies this seer as a haruspex named Spurinna. In addition, on 1 March, Caesar watched Cassius speaking with Brutus at the senate house and said to an aide, "What do you think Cassius is up to? I don't like him, he looks pale."

Two days before the assassination, Cassius met with the conspirators and told them that, should anyone discover the plan, they were to turn their knives on themselves.

Ides of March 

On the Ides of March of 44 BC, conspirators and non-conspirators met at the Senate House of Pompey, located in the Theatre of Pompey, for the senate meeting. Usually, the senators would be meeting at the Roman Forum, but Caesar was financing a reconstruction of the forum and so the senators met in other venues throughout Rome, this being one of them. There were gladiatorial games underway at the Theatre, and Decimus Brutus, who owned a company of gladiators, stationed them in the Portico of Pompey, also located in the Theatre of Pompey. The gladiators could be useful to the conspirators: if a fight broke out to protect Caesar, the gladiators could intervene; if Caesar was killed but the conspirators became under attack, the gladiators could protect them; and since it was impossible to enter the Senate House without going through the Portico, the gladiators could block entrance to both if necessary.

The senators waited for Caesar's arrival, but he did not come. The reason for this is that early that morning, Calpurnia, Caesar's wife, was awoken from a nightmare. She had dreamt that she was holding a murdered Caesar in her arms and mourning him. Other versions have Calpurnia dream that the front pediment of their house had collapsed and that Caesar had died; yet another shows Caesar's body streaming with blood. Calpurnia had no doubt heard Spurinna's warnings of great peril to Caesar's life, which helps explain her visions. Around 5a.m., Calpurnia begged Caesar not to go to the senate meeting that day. After some hesitation, Caesar acquiesced. Although not superstitious, he knew that Spurinna and Calpurnia were involved in Roman politics, and decided to be cautious. Caesar sent Mark Antony to dismiss the Senate. When the conspirators heard of this dismissal, Decimus went to Caesar's home to try to talk him into coming to the Senate meeting. "What do you say, Caesar?" Decimus said. "Will someone of your stature pay attention to a woman's dreams and the omens of foolish men?" Caesar eventually decided to go.

Caesar was walking to the senate house when he caught sight of Spurinna. "Well, the Ides of March have come!" Caesar called out playfully. "Aye, the Ides have come," said Spurinna, "but they are not yet gone." Mark Antony started to enter with Caesar, but was intercepted by one of the plotters (either Trebonius or Decimus Brutus) and detained outside. He remained there until after the assassination, at which point he fled.

According to Plutarch, as Caesar took his seat, Lucius Tillius Cimber presented him with a petition to recall his exiled brother. The other conspirators crowded round to offer their support. Both Plutarch and Suetonius say that Caesar waved him away, but Cimber grabbed Caesar's shoulders and pulled down Caesar's toga. Caesar then cried to Cimber, "Why, this is violence!" ("Ista quidem vis est!"). At the same time, Casca produced his dagger and made a glancing thrust at the dictator's neck. Caesar turned around quickly and caught Casca by the arm. According to Plutarch, he said in Latin, "Casca, you villain, what are you doing?" Casca, frightened, shouted simultaneously "Brother! Help me!". Though Caesar was able to violently throw Casca away, Gaius Servilius Casca stabbed him in the side. Within moments, Caesar was attacked from all directions, with Cassius, slashing Caesar's face, Bucilianus stabbing at the back and Decimus slicing his thigh. Caesar attempted to fight back, but tripped and fell; the men continued stabbing him as he lay defenseless on the lower steps of the portico. Caesar was stabbed 23 times. Suetonius relates that a physician who performed an autopsy on Caesar established that only one wound (the second one to his ribs) had been fatal. This autopsy report (the earliest known post-mortem report in history) describes that Caesar's death was mostly attributable to blood loss from his stab wounds.

Caesar was killed at the base of the Curia of Pompey in the Theatre of Pompey.

The dictator's last words are a contested subject among scholars and historians. Suetonius himself says he said nothing, nevertheless, he mentions that others have written that Caesar's last words were the Greek phrase "" (transliterated as "Kai su, teknon?": "You too, child?" in English). Plutarch also reports that Caesar said nothing, pulling his toga over his head when he saw Brutus among the conspirators. According to Plutarch, after the assassination, Brutus stepped forward as if to say something to his fellow senators not involved in the plot; they, however, fled the building. Brutus and his companions then marched through the city, announcing: "People of Rome, we are once again free!" They were met with silence, as the citizens of Rome had locked themselves inside their houses as soon as the rumours of what had taken place began to spread. According to Suetonius, after the murder all the conspirators fled; Caesar's body lay untouched for some time afterwards, until finally three common slaves put him on a litter and carried him home, with one arm hanging down.

Preceding events
Virgil wrote in the Georgics that several unusual events took place preceding Caesar's assassination. This should be read in the context of the ancient Romans' belief in omens.

Aftermath

A wax statue of Caesar was erected at the Forum displaying the 23 stab wounds. A crowd who had amassed there expressed their anger at the assassins by burning the Senate House. Two days after the assassination, Mark Antony summoned the senate and managed to work out a compromise in which the assassins would not be punished for their acts, but all of Caesar's appointments would remain valid. By doing this, Antony most likely hoped to avoid large cracks in government forming as a result of Caesar's death. Simultaneously, Antony diminished the goals of the conspirators. The result unforeseen by the assassins was that Caesar's death precipitated the end of the Roman Republic. The Roman lower classes, with whom Caesar was popular, became enraged that a small group of aristocrats had sacrificed Caesar. Antony capitalized on the grief of the Roman mob and threatened to unleash them on the Optimates, perhaps with the intent of taking control of Rome himself. But, to his surprise and chagrin, Caesar had named his grandnephew Gaius Octavius his sole heir, bequeathing him the immensely potent Caesar name as well as making him one of the wealthiest citizens in the Republic. Upon hearing of his adoptive father's death, Octavius abandoned his studies in Apollonia and sailed across the Adriatic Sea to Brundisium. Octavius became Gaius Julius Caesar Octavianus or Octavian, the son of the great Caesar, and consequently also inherited the loyalty of much of the Roman populace. Octavian, aged only 18 at the time of Caesar's death, proved to have considerable political skills, and while Antony dealt with Decimus Brutus in the first round of the new civil wars, Octavian consolidated his tenuous position. Antony did not initially consider Octavius a true political threat due to his young age and inexperience, but Octavius quickly gained the support and admiration of Caesar's friends and supporters.

To combat Brutus and Cassius, who were massing an enormous army in Greece, Antony needed soldiers, the money from Caesar's war chests, and the legitimacy that Caesar's name would provide for any action he took against them. With passage of the Lex Titia on 27 November 43 BC, the Second Triumvirate was officially formed, composed of Antony, Octavian, and Caesar's Master of the Horse Lepidus. It formally deified Caesar as Divus Iulius in 42 BC, and Caesar Octavian henceforth became Divi filius ("Son of the Divine"). Seeing that Caesar's clemency had resulted in his murder, the Second Triumvirate brought back proscription, abandoned since Sulla. It engaged in the legally sanctioned murder of a large number of its opponents in order to fund its forty-five legions in the second civil war against Brutus and Cassius. Antony and Octavian defeated them at Philippi.

The Second Triumvirate was ultimately unstable and could not withstand internal jealousies and ambitions. Antony detested Octavian and spent most of his time in the East, while Lepidus favoured Antony but felt himself obscured by both his colleagues. Following the Sicilian revolt, led by Sextus Pompey, a dispute between Lepidus and Octavian regarding the allocation of lands broke out. Octavian accused Lepidus of usurping power in Sicily and of attempted rebellion and, in 36 BC, Lepidus was forced into exile in Circeii and stripped of all his offices except that of Pontifex Maximus. His former provinces were awarded to Octavian. Antony, meanwhile, married Caesar's lover, Cleopatra, intending to use the fabulously wealthy Egypt as a base to dominate Rome. A third civil war subsequently broke out between Octavian on one hand and Antony and Cleopatra on the other. This final civil war culminated in the latter's defeat at Actium in 31 BC; Octavian's forces would then chase Antony and Cleopatra to Alexandria, where they would both commit suicide in 30 BC. With the complete defeat of Antony and the marginalisation of Lepidus, Octavian, having been restyled "Augustus", a name that raised him to the status of a deity, in 27 BC, remained as the sole master of the Roman world and proceeded to establish the Principate as the first Roman "Emperor".

List of conspirators

Most of the conspirators' names are lost to history and only about twenty are known. Nothing is known about some of those whose names have survived. The known members are:

 Marcus Junius Brutus, former Pompeian
 Gaius Cassius Longinus, former Pompeian
 Decimus Junius Brutus Albinus, former Caesarian
 Gaius Trebonius, former Caesarian
 Lucius Tillius Cimber, former Caesarian, the one responsible for setting the stage for the attack
 Publius Servilius Casca Longus, former Caesarian, the one responsible for the first stab
 Servius Sulpicius Galba, former Caesarian
 Servilius Casca, former Caesarian, brother of Publius Casca
 Pontius Aquila, former Pompeian
 Quintus Ligarius, former Pompeian
 Lucius Minucius Basilus, former Caesarian
 Gaius Cassius Parmensis
 Caecilius, former Pompeian
 Bucilianus, former Pompeian, brother of Caecilius
 Rubrius Ruga, former Pompeian
 Marcus Spurius, former Pompeian
 Publius Sextius Naso, former Pompeian
 Petronius
 Publius Turullius
 Pacuvius Labeo

Marcus Tullius Cicero was not a member of the conspiracy and was surprised by it. He later wrote to the conspirator Trebonius that he wished he had been "invited to that superb banquet" and believed that the conspirators should also have killed Mark Antony.

Gallery

See also 
 List of assassinated and executed heads of state and government
 Acta Caesaris
 Death of Alexander the Great
 Death of Cleopatra
 Julius Caesar, a play by William Shakespeare
 The Ides of March, a novel by Thornton Wilder
 The Throne of Caesar, a novel by Steven Saylor
Amanita caesarea

Notes

References

Bibliography

 J. A. Crook, Andrew Lintott, Elizabeth Rawson (editors), The Cambridge Ancient History', Volume IX, The Last Age of the Roman Republic, Cambridge University Press, 1992.

Relevant literature
Sheldon, Rose Mary. Kill Caesar!: Assassination in the Early Roman Empire. Rowman & Littlefield, 2018.

External links

 Account of the assassination from the historian Appian. Section 114 contains a list of conspirators.
 Suetonius, Life of Julius Caesar, includes an account of the plot
 The Assassination of Julius Caesar (The Ides of March, 44 B.C.E.) – video by YouTube channel Historia Civilis

44 BC
1st century BC in Italy
1st century BC in the Roman Republic
 
Conspiracies

Murder in Rome